The  are a group of large religious statues carved in bas-relief into a tuff cliff in Odaka neighborhood of the city of Minamisōma, Fukushima Prefecture in the Tōhoku region of Japan.  The site was designated a National Historic Site of Japan in 1930.

Overview
The statues are in three groups. These statues are believed to have been carved during the early Heian period, but do not appear in any surviving documentary records, and their history is unknown. In terms of size and time period, they correspond to the Usuki Stone Buddhas in Kyushu but are in much poorer preservation.

 The  has a height of 5.5 meters and a width of 15 meters, and consists of four seated images of Yakushi Nyōrai and other Buddhas, flanked by two bodhisattva. The carving is the best preserved of the group, and is protected by a chapel. Some traces of yellow and vermilion pigment remains, indicating that this statue was once colorfully painted; however, the face of the main image is largely obliterated.

 The  is centered on a seated image of Senju Kannon with a height of nine meters, surrounded by many smaller images. It is located slightly to the northeast of the Yakushidō Stone Buddha. It was exposed to the elements and is poorly preserved, but in style it is similar to a statue of Kannon found at Kiyomizu-dera in Kyoto.  The chapel protecting the carving was destroyed by the 2011 Tōhoku earthquake, but has since been repaired.

 The  is located approximately 100 meters to the north of the Yakushi-dō Stone Buddha, but is so badly worn that it is unrecognizable. The outer layers of the carving have completely peeled off, leaving only the core of the image. It is named as a statue of Amida Nyōrai by tradition. 

The site is located approximately 20 minutes on foot from Momouchi Station on the JR East Jōban Line.

See also

List of Historic Sites of Japan (Fukushima)

References

External links
Minamisoma Cty Tourist Information
Odaka Tourist Information

Minamisōma
Tourist attractions in Fukushima Prefecture
Buddha statues in Japan
Historic Sites of Japan
Buddhist archaeological sites in Japan